John Guthrie Blair (23 August 1905, in Neilston – 1974) was a professional footballer who played for Third Lanark, Tottenham Hotspur and Sheffield United.

Football career 
Blair began his professional career at Third Lanark before joining Tottenham Hotspur. 

He scored on his Lilywhites debut in a 2-1 victory over Everton at White Hart Lane in August 1926 in the old First Division. He played a total of 30 matches and scored 14 goals in all competitions for the Spurs between 1926–27. 

Blair left London and signed for Sheffield United, where he went on to feature in a further 26 matches and netting seven goals between 1927–28. 

He ended his playing career at Irish club Fordsons.

References 

1905 births
1974 deaths
People from Neilston
Sportspeople from East Renfrewshire
Scottish footballers
English Football League players
Scottish Football League players
League of Ireland players
Third Lanark A.C. players
Tottenham Hotspur F.C. players
Sheffield United F.C. players
Fordsons F.C. players
Cork F.C. players
Association football inside forwards
Neilston Victoria F.C. players